The Adelaide United Training Centre, often referred to as its geographical location in Ridley Road, is the training ground of Adelaide United Football Club.

History and development
At the commencement of construction Glenn Docherty (the Mayor of the City of Playford) remarked that having Adelaide United at the new facilities within Elizabeth would be fantastic. The  Training Centre was officially opened by Adelaide United Chief Executive Michael Petrillo on 17 September 2015.

References

Soccer training grounds in Australia
Adelaide United FC